"Äckligt" (lit. "Disgusting") is a single by Swedish singing R&B duo Ansiktet, from their debut studio album #DENNYARNBMANNEN. It was released in Sweden as a digital download on 20 December 2011. The song has topped the Swedish Singles Chart.

Music video
A music video to accompany the release of "Äckligt" was first released onto YouTube on 2 January 2012 at a total length of four minutes and five seconds.

Track listing
Digital download
 "Äckligt" - 4:02
 "Äckligt" (Instrumental) - 4:09

Charts

Weekly charts and certifications

Year-end charts

Release history

References

2011 singles
Ansiktet (band) songs
Number-one singles in Sweden
2011 songs
Universal Music Group singles
Song articles with missing songwriters